The Heckler & Koch MP7 (German: Maschinenpistole 7) is a personal defense weapon chambered for the HK 4.6×30mm armor-piercing cartridge designed by German defence manufacturer Heckler & Koch.

It was designed (together with the new cartridge) to meet NATO requirements published in 1989, which called for an SMG-type weapon with a greater capacity to defeat Kevlar body armour (versus pre-existing submachine guns using conventional pistol cartridges such as .45 ACP and 9×19mm Parabellum).

The MP7 went into production in 2001, and is a direct rival to the FN P90, also developed in response to NATO's requirement by Belgian company FN Herstal. The weapon has been revised since its introduction and the latest production variants are the MP7A1 and MP7A2.

The proliferation of cheap yet effective soft body armor has begun to make guns that fire pistol ammunition (such as Heckler & Koch's earlier MP5 submachine gun and USP pistol) ineffective. In response to this trend, Heckler & Koch designed the MP7 (along with the cancelled UCP pistol, which uses the same ammunition) to penetrate soft body armor while being small enough to be used in place of either a pistol or a submachine gun.

Design details

The MP7 uses a short-stroke piston gas system as is used on H&K's G36 and HK416 in place of a blowback system traditionally seen on submachine guns. The 4.6×30mm ammunition is exclusive to the gun and offers low recoil. This ammunition is unique among submachine guns in that the bullet is made almost entirely of a hardened steel penetrator instead of softer copper or lead. The MP7 has a cyclic rate of fire of around 950 rounds per minute.

The MP7 allows a conventional 20, 30 or 40-round box magazine to be fitted within the pistol grip (the 20-round magazine is comparable in size to a 15-round 9×19mm magazine, while the 40-round magazine compares to a 30-round 9×19mm magazine). It features an ambidextrous fire selector, bolt catch lever and magazine release. It has an extendable stock and a folding front grip (MP7 and MP7A1 variants, the MP7A2 lacks the folding front grip); it can be fired either one-handed or two-handed. It is compact and light, due to the use of polymers in its construction.

Ammunition
The MP7's specially designed armor piercing (AP) high-velocity rounds consist of either copper-plated solid steel (DM11), alloy-plated steel jacket (DM21) or copper-alloy-jacketed lead core projectiles (Fiocchi FMJ ZP). Standard AP high-velocity DM11 (Ultimate Combat) round with a 2.0-g (31 gr) projectile has a muzzle velocity of 720 m/s (2,362 ft/s) and a muzzle energy of 506 J (373 ft-lb). The DM11 round penetrates the NATO CRISAT target (20 layers of Kevlar with 1.6 mm titanium backing) at 200 m. The round has a small diameter, allowing for redoubling penetration capability and high capacity in a very small magazine.

VBR of Belgium produces a 4.6×30mm two-part controlled-fragmenting projectile that is claimed to increase the content of the permanent wound cavity and double the chance to hit a vital organ.
Heckler & Koch claims that the CPS Black Tip ammunition made by Fiocchi has a muzzle energy of approximately 525 J, which would be comparable to 9×19mm Parabellum rounds.

Accessories
The MP7 features a full-length, top-mounted Picatinny rail that comes as standard with folding fore and rear iron sights attached. When the sights are folded flat, they resemble Patridge style open sights. Folded up, they feature aperture sights. The sights can easily be removed by loosening a single screw and lifting them off. It can fit additional rails on the sides of the barrel, which allow it to mount commercial optical sights (telescopic and red dot sights), laser aiming modules (LAM), and tactical flashlights. It can also accept a suppressor, and its tailor-made suppressor does not interfere with its accuracy or rate of fire.

Variants

PDW: The first prototype was shown in 1999 and was designated as the 'PDW' (Personal Defense Weapon). It had a short Picatinny rail on the top and a smooth pistol grip surface.
MP7: In 2001 it was designated as the 'MP7' and went into production. Changes include a full-length Picatinny rail, a thick curved stock and an anti-slide surface on the pistol grip much like the HK USP. It also features a folding iron sights mounted on the Picatinny rail and the button to fold the foregrip was made larger for easier operation.
MP7A1: In 2003 its designation was changed to 'MP7A1' and featured a redesigned pistol grip with a different surface and curved shape, a smaller stock with a straight buttpad, side-mounted picatinny rails as standard and the folding iron sights were made more compact. The weapon was made slightly longer, but because the stock was shortened, the overall length did not change. The stock is also able to be locked into 3 positions. Recent MP7A1 models have a trigger safety similar to a Glock pistol; the middle section of the trigger must be pulled first before the outer part will move. This helps to stop accidental discharges if the trigger is bumped.
MP7A2: A variant without the folding front grip but features a Picatinny rail to mount various grips in line with the user's preference.
MP7-SF: A semi-automatic only variant of the MP7 which is currently used by the Ministry of Defence Police in the United Kingdom.

Users

Gallery

Heckler & Koch UCP

The Heckler & Koch Universal Combat Pistol (HK UCP), also known as the HK P46 is a double action, semi-automatic handgun developed under commission for the German Bundeswehr. The concept for the UCP was later cancelled at the prototype stage.

History and description
The UCP was to be the companion sidearm to the HK MP7, using the same HK 4.6×30mm bottlenecked cartridge. The 4.6×30mm round is a direct competitor to the 5.7×28mm by Fabrique Nationale de Herstal (FN). As such, the UCP would have been a direct competitor to the FN Five-seven pistol. Both have greater armor-piercing capabilities and less recoil compared to other commonly used military handgun cartridges, such as the 9×19mm Parabellum or .45 ACP.

The UCP operated on the delayed-blowback operating principle. The external design of the UCP appears to have been borrowed from the HK P2000 pistol, and includes ambidextrous controls, interchangeable backstraps, and a Picatinny rail system for the attachment of accessories. Like the USP and P2000 series of pistols, the trigger mechanism is reported to have been modular and capable of different configurations. The UCP was designed to accept an extended, threaded barrel capable of accepting the attachment of a sound suppressor made by Brügger & Thomet.

The design remained in the prototype phase , and had been reported as entering limited trials with the Bundeswehr.

In July 2009, HK USA's president, Wayne Weber, indicated that the UCP project has been cancelled because "HK felt it did not provide adequate ballistics in handgun form."

See also
 FN P90
 Mauser MP-57
 PP-2000
 PM-63 RAK
 SR-2 Veresk
 ST Kinetics CPW

References

External links 

 
 Nazarian's Gun's Recognition Guide (FILM) H&K MP7 PDW Presentation (.wmv)
 Video of the MP7
 Modern Firearms: Heckler-Koch Ultimate Combat Pistol/HK UCP

MP7
HK 4.6×30mm firearms
Machine pistols
Personal defense weapons
Post–Cold War weapons of Germany
Police weapons
Short stroke piston firearms
Weapons and ammunition introduced in 2001